The Industrial and Provident Societies Partnership Act 1852, also known (somewhat unjustifiably) as Slaney's Act, was a significant legislative landmark in the establishment of the co-operative movement in the United Kingdom.

Background
Prior to 1852, co-operative societies had protected their members capital by registering under the Friendly Societies Act 1846. However the act specified protection only for purchases, not for sales; so the co-operative societies were forced to use a legal fiction of dubious merit to cover themselves when selling, and it was this that brought home the need for a new statute to regularise their position.

Passage
John Ludlow played an important role in promoting the Act of 1852. He had initially proposed a comparable Bill for Whig passage in 1851; but was blocked by Henry Labouchere at the Board of Trade. The following year Disraeli persuaded his colleagues that promoting such social reform would be politically advantageous for the Tories, as well as offering a route for working-class energies to be incorporated into society; and the Bill passed into law.

The Act not only provided a legal framework for the co-operative movement, but also specified much of its future direction - for example laying down the principle that up to 1/3rd of profits could be shared among members, the rest being used to build up the business.

See also

References

Further reading
Ch. Kingsley, Life and Memories Vol i

Cooperative movement
Co-operatives in the United Kingdom
History of social movements
Mutualism (movement)
United Kingdom Acts of Parliament 1852